Märta Ester Lovisa Johansson (later Engdahl, 24 January 1907 – 6 January 1998) was a Swedish diver. She competed in the 3 m springboard at the 1924 Summer Olympics, but failed to reach the final. Her sister-in-law Signe Johansson-Engdahl was also an Olympic diver, and her elder brother Nils Johansson was an Olympic ice hockey player.

References

1907 births
1998 deaths
Swedish female divers
Olympic divers of Sweden
Divers at the 1924 Summer Olympics
Stockholms KK divers
Divers from Stockholm